Kuulo Kalamees (born 15 April 1934 in Tartu) is an Estonian mycologist.

Since 1959, he has taught at the University of Tartu and the Estonian University of Life Sciences; since 1997 Emeritus Professor.

He has described several genera, e.g. Tricholomella.

References

Living people
1934 births
Estonian mycologists
University of Tartu alumni
Academic staff of the University of Tartu
Academic staff of the Estonian University of Life Sciences
People from Tartu